The FC Hertha Wiesbach is a German association football club from the Wiesenbach suburb of Eppelborn, Saarland.

The club's greatest success has been to earn promotion to the tier five Oberliga Rheinland-Pfalz/Saar in 2013.

History
The club was formed in August 1908 as SSK Hertha Mangelhausen, with the name Hertha derived from the much more famous Hertha BSC Berlin. In the mid-1920s the club adopted its current name.

For most of its history the club has been a non-descript amateur side in local football. The clubs slow rise through the league system began in 1992 when it earned promotion to the then tier-six Bezirksliga Saarland-Nord. Wiesenbach played in this league for the next eight season until a league championship took it up to the Landesliga in 2000.

Four seasons in the Landesliga Saarland-Nordost followed until 2004, when another league title meant promotion to the Verbandsliga Saarland. Wiesenbach spend five seasons in this league, generally achieving good results. In 2009 the Saarlandliga was introduced as a new league in the Saarland between the Oberliga and the Verbandsliga and the club qualified for this league on the strength of a third place in 2008–09. The next four seasons Wiesenbach always finished in the top four, culminating in another league championship in 2013.

The later allowed the club to leave the Saarland league system for the first time and earn promotion to the Oberliga Rheinland-Pfalz/Saar. In its first season there Wiesenbach finished in eighth place.

Honours
The club's honours:

League
 Saarlandliga
 Champions: 2013
 Landesliga Saarland-Nordost
 Champions: 2004
 Bezirksliga Saarland-Nord
 Champions: 2000
 Runners-up: 1999

Cup
 Saarland Cup
 Runners-up: 2013

Recent seasons
The recent season-by-season performance of the club:

With the introduction of the Regionalligas in 1994 and the 3. Liga in 2008 as the new third tier, below the 2. Bundesliga, all leagues below dropped one tier. With the introduction of the Saarlandliga in 2009 all leagues below dropped one tier.

Key

References

External links
 Official team site  
 Das deutsche Fußball-Archiv  historical German domestic league tables

Football clubs in Germany
Football clubs in Saarland
Association football clubs established in 1908
1908 establishments in Germany